Albert Charles Joseph Simard [Albert C. J. Simard] (ca. 1891 — May 2, 1973)
was a French-American medical doctor, Legion of Honour, active in many organizations, during and post WWII.

Serving in WWI, Simard was seriously injured in 1914-1918 and was awarded with the Legion of Honour. [Chavalier de la Légion d'honneur].

Dr. Simard received his medical degree from the University of Paris in 1921. In the same year, he authored there, the La réaction de fixation de l'alexine: son application au diagnostic sérologique de la peste, "work of the Pasteur Institute in Paris, plague laboratory." Simard continued at Pasteur Institute in the early 1930s.

Simard moved to NY around 1935 - 1936. 

Dr. Simard was an endocrinologist, also a fashionable gland specialist in Manhattan, NY.

He was a member of various medical associations, including: the American Geriatric Society, the Endocrine Society, the Academy-International of Medicine, the New York County Medical Society, the Medical Society of the State of New York and the American Medical Association.

In 1939, Simard was elected to head the Comité des Associations Françaises de New York - USA.  That year the Second World War broke out. At the time, Simard was "medical attache of the French consulate in New York City."

In an April 1940 report, he appears as a "French civilian relief worker." He was President of the French Societies of New York. Described by famed professor Fred G. Hoffherr as: "one of the leaders of the French colony." Simard was President of the Federation of French War Veterans of the World War.

In 1940, Simard was one of the founders of France Forever. It was founded on June 29 in his apartment.

Following Charles de Gaulle's appeal on 18 June 1940, on 29 June, Simard, called a public meeting to launch a support movement.

Stating:
We are convinced that France and all enslaved European democracies can be freed only by British victory and that a German victory over Britain will be the signal for an attack on all of the Americas.

In the Nov 1940 protest against Vichy anti-Jewish legislation, as vice president of France Forever, he addressed the rally, reading a message of support de Gaulle had sent. From being vice president, following Richard de Rochemont, Simard would later serve as its President, Chairman of the executive committee, of sessions.

On January 15, 1942, at the Red Cross, "two days were observed in honor of foreign nations and People," Simard represented France. At the Allied Day event, he "spoke on the goal of the Free French Movement," and for the Red Cross.

Simard would later become involved with the Society for the Prevention of World War III, serving as its Secretary.

In March 1946, Simard reviewed Erich Maria Remarque's Arch of Triumph in Free World.

On Oct 9, 1946, an exhibit "France Comes Back," opened in NY in the Museum of Natural History, under Simard activities. Among those involved in the exhibit, was author historian Gilbert Chinard.

The first annual French-American friendship dinner was held on April 29, 1956 at Waldorf-Astoria, with 300 guests present. Simard was chairman of the dinner committee and one of its speakers.

In the 1950s, Simard was also active in Boris Gourevitch's founded Union for the Protection of the Human Person. In 1955, he wrote a short bio on Gourevitch in his book.

Dr. Simard died in NY, on May 2, 1973, at the age of 82.

References 

American people of French descent
 
1973 deaths
Physicians from New York City